The Thailand Quality Award or TQA is the national quality award for Performance Excellence in Thailand. The TQA has a world class technical foundation and awarding process. It is closely modeled after the Malcolm Baldrige National Quality Award (MBNQA) and is an award with a rigorous screening process together with a standardized assessment system employing volunteering elite assessors from the private, public, government, state enterprise, medical, and education sectors.

History and description
The Thailand Quality Award (TQA) was first launched in 2002. However, the history of the award started on September 5, 1996, with the signing of a Memorandum of Understanding (MOU) between the Thailand Productivity Institute (FTPI) and the National Science and Technology Development Agency (NSTDA) to study the guidelines for establishing an award.

The FTPI has been appointed by the government to be the Thailand Quality Award (TQA) Secretariat Office, also referred to as the National Quality Award Office. It is the main organization in Thailand encouraging the manufacturing and service sectors to adopt the TQA framework as an essential tool to improve their management capability.

On March 4, 2004, the TQA was won for the first time by a Thai company, Thai Paper Company Limited. a subsidiary of Siam Cement Group (SCG).

In 2013, the lead assessor of the TQA, Bill Voravuth Chengsupanimit, stated "In Thailand, upon signing an agreement between the Foundation of Thailand Productivity Institute and the National Science and Technology Development Agency, on September 5, 1996, the Thailand Quality Award (TQA) was initiated. The resulting TQA technical and decision-making processes are identical to the Malcolm Baldrige National Quality Award. Since TQA's inception, only four organizations have scored above 650 points to qualify for the TQA, out of hundreds of applicants. However, more than 50 organizations have achieved the Thailand Quality Class status by scoring more than 350 points."

On January 16, 2020, the FTPI hosted an event where they covered changes in the TQA for 2020–2021. The FTPI stated that the content of the criteria was revised to suit changing global social and economic conditions as well as to comply with the US MBNQA criteria.

It was announced on February 12, 2020, that True Group's Mobile Business Group had won the Thailand Quality Award 2019. This was the first time since 2012 that a Thai organization qualified by passing the rigorous evaluation criteria to receive the award. True Group's Mobile Business Group was also the first Thai telecommunication organization to win the award. However, the Government Housing Bank also achieved the TQA in 2019.

Objectives
The stated objectives of the TQA are:

 To support the implementation of the National Quality Award guidelines to improve competitiveness
 To honor the organizations that have achieved global standards
 To encourage learning and exchange of practices that Excellence
 To show the international commitment to raise the standard of excellence in management

Thailand Quality Award Recipients

See also
List of national quality awards
Total Quality Management

References

External links 
  
  

Quality awards
Awards established in 2002
Thai awards